The Chinese Consolidated Benevolent Association (CCBA) ( in the Western United States, Midwest, and Western Canada; 中華公所 (中华公所) zhōnghuá gōngsuǒ (Jyutping: zung1wa4 gung1so2) in the East) is a historical Chinese association established in various parts of the United States and Canada with large Chinese communities. It is also known by other names, such as Chinese Six Companies (Chinese: 六大公司) in San Francisco, especially when it began in the 19th century; Chong Wa Benevolent Association in Seattle, Washington; and United Chinese Society in Honolulu, Hawaii. The association's clientele were the pioneer Chinese immigrants of the late 19th and early 20th centuries, who came mainly from eight districts on the west side of the Pearl River Delta in Guangdong (Canton province) in southern China, and their descendants. The latter wave of Chinese immigration after 1965, who emigrated from a much wider area of China and did not experience overseas the level of hostilities faced by the pioneers, did not join the CCBA, which greatly lessened its influence.

Influence
Since its organization in the 1850s and formal establishment in 1882 in San Francisco's Chinatown, the Chinese Consolidated Benevolent Association (CCBA) has received a diverse range of publicity from the American media. Much of the attention often overlooked inherent cultural differences, which ultimately led to misunderstanding by much of the American population. This factor together with increasing anti-Chinese sentiment hastened the need for an empowered Chinese organization in the United States. Thus, the CCBA was formed out of the need for the Chinese to have organized social, political, and economic structures.

The CCBA was set up to help Chinese people relocate and travel to and from the US, including returning the bodies of the deceased to China. With many families fragmented between China and across the US, the association also allowed for communal care of the sick or poor. When the association became more prominent and anti-Chinese sentiment increased, the organization also offered legal and physical protection. Physical abuse was not uncommon in Chinatown from racist Americans. Such incidents led to the rise of groups like the Tongs, which were noted to have protected Chinese from abuse by white miners.

The CCBA also exerted political power, becoming authorized to speak on behalf of Chinatown throughout the United States. The CCBA board of directors became increasingly powerful as it consisted of wealthy merchants and businessmen. The board had many dealings with local and federal governments, exerting influence in a variety of methods. One method was the use of a Caucasian attorney, who was also the spokesman of the organization, which likely helped reduce the push-back.

Through the 1800s, a large portion of Chinese immigrants to California came for the promise of work in the gold mines. As gold caused California's economy to excel, the Chinese became an integral part of this economy. When gold mining decreased, the Chinese found other opportunities including fishing, food services, farming, and building of railroads. Many in the mid- to-late 19th century argued that the influx of Chinese immigrants decreased job availability for American citizens. However, the job competition theory is disputed because of the strong language barrier which forced many of the Chinese to create their own jobs.

San Francisco

History

Chinese immigrants felt that the US government did not protect their interests. To protect their own interests, Chinese businessmen from Guangdong formed the Kong Chow Association (meaning "Pearl River Delta"). When tensions arose between Cantonese people of different dialects and districts, the association split in two. Four more organizations appeared in the 1850s in prominent neighborhoods in San Francisco. The organizations consisted of the six most important Chinese district associations of California. The associations had some mutual coordination before the Chinese Consolidated Benevolent Association, or Chinese Six Companies (Chinese: 六大公司) was established in 1882 in San Francisco. Later, branches were established in other US cities.

These immigrant organizations were rooted in the Chinese tradition of huiguan, viz., support groups for merchants and workers originating from a given area. The vast majority of Chinese in California were from various districts on the west side of the Pearl River Delta in Guangdong province. Thus, the first huiguan in San Francisco emerged in 1851, the Kong Chow Company. In 1851, the Sam Yap Company formed; it was associated with Nanhai, Panyu, Shunde, Sanshui, and Xingyun districts. Towards the end of 1851, the Sze Yap Company of Xinhui, Kaiping, Xinning, and Enping districts was formed. In 1852, the Yeong Wo Company was formed of Heung-shan, Tung-kun, and Tsang-shing districts. Also in 1852, the Hip Kat company was formed by Hakka immigrants from Bow On, Chak Tai, Tung Gwoon, and Chu Mui districts. Later, The Sze Yap company divided and the Ning Yeung company emerged.

The Six Companies served as ambassadors of the Qing government to Chinatown and provided services for Chinese workers in San Francisco. Their early efforts included deterring prostitution in the Chinese community, encouraging Chinese immigrants to lead moral lives, and discouraging excessive Chinese immigration, which was causing hostility toward Chinese in US. The Six Companies created a safety net for sick Chinese workers, lending them money. They opened a Chinese-language school, settled disputes among members, maintained a Chinese census, and helped members send remittances to their home villages through district associations. In 1875, they endorsed the position that continued Chinese immigration caused a general lowering of wages for both whites and Chinese in America.

Immigration in the 1960s
Though the Six Companies discouraged the continuing immigration of Chinese to the United States, the phenomenon persisted throughout the years. In the 1960s, discrimination began to arise within these Chinese communities. Assimilation of Chinese communities increased through the years, causing a cultural clash within the Chinese communities between newly immigrated people and those who were American-born and had assimilated to the culture. Many new Chinese immigrants often came to America without savings because most of their money was spent on their transportation to the United States. Many immigrant children were also affected by these conditions, having to work when they were not in school, and struggling to learn English. This led to many of the children of new immigrants dropping out and joining gangs. These gangs were often involved in acts of violence that occurred in Chinatown. Though this was the life that was led by many of these gangs, they also asked for help. In 1968, during a Human Rights Commission hearing held in San Francisco, the Wah Ching gang asked for a community clubhouse and a two-year program to help them gain vocational skills and earn high-school diplomas. The Chinese Consolidated Benevolent Association advised the Human Rights Commission: "They have not shown that they are sorry or that they will change their ways. They have threatened the community. If you give in to this group, you are only going to have another hundred immigrants come in and have a whole new series of threats and demands." As a result of this, the Concerned Chinese for Action and Change was founded in 1968 to emphasize the social issues that existed in their community and to push the Chinese Consolidated Benevolent Association to make changes in the system.

New York City

In New York City, the Chinese Consolidated Benevolent Association (CCBA) was established in 1883. The parent organization of the Chinese Community Center, the CCBA was founded in 1883 and has represented and served the needs of Chinese Americans in New York City ever since. Historically, it has performed a quasi-governmental role in the Chinese community. Throughout its history, business ownership has been a goal of many residents of Chinatown, and has been supported both financially and through training, by the CCBA. Today, there are local CCBA agencies in 26 cities with substantial Chinese populations across North America.

Currently, the CCBA represents the Chinese Americans living in the Greater New York Metro area.  Internally, the CCBA is the hinge that keeps the Chinese American community intact and vigorous.  Specifically, the CCBA:

 Provides social services
 Provides personal and commercial conflict resolution and mediations
 Promotes Chinese traditions and cultural heritage
 Serves as a bridge between Chinese American immigrants and the mainstream groups
 Promotes Chinese American interests
 Engages in charitable activities
 Sponsors educational and recreational activities
 Sponsors and promotes youth services
 Provides and advocates for small businesses

In New York City, the CCBA is an umbrella organization of 60 member organizations representing a cross-section of New York's Chinese community. They include professional and trade organizations such as the Chinese Chamber of Commerce and the Chinese American Restaurant Association; civic organizations such as the American Legion, Lt. Lam Lau Post; religious, cultural, and women's organizations; fellow-provincial organization such as the Hoy Sun Ning Yung Association and the Lin Sing Association; and family organizations such as the Lee, Eng, and Chan Family Association.

The CCBA spearheaded the move to form the Chinese Voters Federation in May 2004 to encourage qualified Chinese American citizens to register and vote in the 2004 Presidential election, a community-wide effort that produced an increase of 24.2% in the number of Chinese American voters in Chinatown. It strongly supported the formation of the Chinatown Partnership Local Development Corporation, the Asian Job Service Employer Committee, and the Greater New York Chinese Community Dollars for Scholars program, all of which benefit the Chinese communities in many important ways.

Immediately following the earthquake and tsunami disasters in south Asia, the CCBA led an emergency community-wide campaign to raise much-needed funds for the victims, a drive that raised more than $500,000 for the American Red Cross Emergency Response Fund. In September 2005, right after the Hurricane Katrina disaster, the CCBA and Sing Tao Daily joined together and raised $170,000 for the victims.

Recently, the CCBA solidified the relations with different city departments and agencies to solve many ongoing problems in Chinatown, including insufficient parking spaces, illegal enforcement of parking regulations, confusing sanitation enforcement regulations, etc. The NYPD community affairs bureau now hosts monthly seminars on different safety topics at the CCBA.  Its efforts have resulted in the establishment of a direct channel to the government without language barriers.

The CCBA also works with many mainstream organizations to provide services to the Chinese American community, such as the Visiting Nurse Service of New York and the American Cancer Society. In December 2006, the CCBA and the American Red Cross of Greater New York signed a memorandum of understanding to coordinate programs in Chinatown that will help prepare and train the Chinese community for any kind of emergency.

The CCBA fulfills its functions by working closely with local businesses and residents as well as by maintaining close contact with Chinese American organizations located throughout North America and supporting integration into mainstream of American society.

Chinese Consolidated Benevolent Association of New England
The Chinese Consolidated Benevolent Association of New England, popularly known as CCBA, is a tax-exempt organization established in 1923.  Currently with 35 members consisting of family associations and community organizations, the CCBA serves as the umbrella organization for the Chinese communities of New England.  Originally located at 14 Oxford Street, it relocated to its current address at 90 Tyler Street in the 1980s, when the City of Boston sold the building that was the Quincy Elementary School to the CCBA for one dollar.

A president, an English secretary, a Chinese secretary, a treasurer, and an auditor complete the executive board of directors who manage the daily affairs of the CCBA with the help of several office workers.  Unlike the 43 members of the board of directors who are delegate representatives from member organizations, the 5 members of the executive board are elected by the board of directors biennially.

The CCBA is also home to two family associations, a federal credit union, Chinese and English classes, a magazine and media services group, and the well-known Chinatown Crime Watch program, where volunteers patrol the streets of Chinatown daily to provide the ever-present vigilance needed to keep crime rates at a minimum around the neighborhood.

Besides sponsoring activities, the CCBA manages Tai Tung Village and Waterford Place, apartment complexes that provide much-needed affordable housing to the Chinese community. Partnering with Chinatown Main Street and other organizations, the CCBA coordinates activities such as the lion dance celebration for the Lunar New Year and the annual August Moon Festival, to attract visitors and to further economic growth in Chinatown; it also hosts dignitary visits to the Chinatown community.

Seattle

In Seattle, Washington, the Chong Wa Association was established around 1915. New information, however, shows that it was already in existence in 1892. (see link below: Chinese in Northwest America Research Committee).

Vancouver

Branches

The Chinese Consolidated Benevolent Association has several branches in the United States and Canada, including in:
Augusta, Georgia - 548 Walker Street
Bakersfield, California - 2128 N Street
Boston, Massachusetts - 90 Tyler Street
Chicago, Illinois - 250 West 22nd Place
Cleveland, Ohio - 2154 Rockwell Avenue
Detroit, Michigan - 415 Peterboro Street
Edmonton, Alberta - 9645 101A Avenue NW
Fresno, California - 949 Waterman Avenue
Honolulu, Hawaii - 42 North King Street
Houston, Texas - 10303 Westoffice Drive
Littleton, Colorado - 1100 West Littleton Boulevard
Los Angeles, California - 925 North Broadway
Marysville, California - 226 1st Street
Montreal, Quebec - 112 La Gauchetiere West
New York City, New York - 62 Mott Street
Oakland, California - 373 9th Street
Philadelphia, Pennsylvania - 930 Race Street
Portland, Oregon - 315 NW Davis Street
Regina, Saskatchewan - 1817 Osler Street
Sacramento, California - 915 Fourth Street
Salinas, California - 1 California Street
San Diego, California - 428 3rd Avenue
San Francisco, California - 843 Stockton Street
Seattle, Washington - 522 Seventh Avenue South
Stockton, California - 212 East Lafayette Street
Toronto, Ontario - 84 Augusta Avenue
Vancouver, British Columbia - 108 East Pender Street
Victoria, British Columbia - 636 Fisgard Street
Washington, D.C. - 510 I (Eye) Street NW
Windsor, Ontario - 436 Wyandotte Street West

See also
Chinatown
Chinatown, San Francisco, California
Chinese Clan Association
Kongsi
List of Chinese American Associations
Tong (organization)
Chinese Boycott of 1905
 Chinese Cemetery of Los Angeles

References

Further reading
 Delehanty, Randolph. Chinatown Introduction: a Tale of Four Cities, Chronicle Books, sfgate.com. Undated, accessed online October 17, 2007.
 Lai, David Chuen-Yan. "The Chinese Consolidated Benevolent Association in Victoria: Its Origins and Functions." BC Studies: The British Columbian Quarterly 15 (1972): 53–67. Online
 Lai, Him Mark. "Historical development of the Chinese consolidated benevolent association/huiguan system." Chinese America: History and Perspectives 1 (1987): 13–51.
 Liu, Ying, and Tina Bebbington. "The Chinese Consolidated Benevolent Association and China: 1884-1922-A Selective Guide of Primary Sources." (2012) online.
"Documents of the Chinese Six Companies Pertaining to Immigration", p. 17–25 (especially "A Memorial from Representative Chinamen in America", p. 18–23) in Judy Yung, Gordon H. Chang, and Him Mark Lai (compilers and editors), Chinese American Voices, University of California Press (2006). .

External links
Chinese Consolidated Benevolent Association and Chinese Community Center, Inc (New York City), official site. Accessed online October 17, 2007.
Chong Wa Association (Seattle) on vrseattle.com. Accessed online October 17, 2007.
https://web.archive.org/web/20110930224134/http://www.zsnews.cn/zt/zsofa/2006/07/25/581713.shtml (In Simplified Chinese)
 1000-foot dragon travels through Los Angeles' Chinatown, August 10, 1938, in Los Angeles Times Photographic Archive (Collection 1429). UCLA Library Special Collections, Charles E. Young Research Library, University of California, Los Angeles.

Chinatown, San Francisco
Chinatown, Manhattan
Chinese-American organizations
Chinese-American history
History of San Francisco
History of New York City
Organizations based in San Francisco
Organizations based in New York City
Ethnic fraternal orders in the United States
Chinese diaspora